The Joseph Campau House is a private residence located at 2910 East Jefferson Avenue in Detroit, Michigan. It was listed on the National Register of Historic Places in 1985. The house is currently used as a law office.

Description
The Joseph Campau House is a two-story house with a symmetrical three-bay façade; the exterior is faced with flush board siding on the front and clapboards on the other three sides. A porch, constructed in the 20th century, spans the front. The exterior is plain, with a pedimental window head center gabled second-story window and a plain entablature board under the eaves as the only decorations.

Significance

The house is one of the oldest residences in Detroit. Although he never lived in this house, it was built on land that was originally part of the Joseph Campau farm, a large tract of land awarded to Joseph Campau's grandfather in 1734. Joseph Campau was among Detroit's leading citizens and wealthiest landowners at the dawn of the 19th century.

References

Houses in Detroit
Houses on the National Register of Historic Places in Michigan
Houses completed in 1835
National Register of Historic Places in Detroit
Joseph Campau